KJLY (104.5 FM) is a radio station located in Blue Earth, Minnesota. The station airs a Christian-based religious format.

KJLY also uses a number of low-powered translators throughout the southern Minnesota and northern Iowa regions, in towns such as Mankato, New Ulm, Austin, Sleepy Eye, Owatonna and St. Peter in Minnesota and Mason City, Iowa,

External links
KJLY's website

Moody Radio affiliate stations
Radio stations established in 1983
Christian radio stations in Minnesota